Warwick is an unincorporated community in central Alberta within the County of Minburn No. 27, located  north of Highway 16,  east of Edmonton.

Climate

References

Localities in the County of Minburn No. 27